The 2018–19 Tulsa Golden Hurricane women's basketball team will represent the University of Tulsa during the 2018–19 NCAA Division I women's basketball season. The season marks the fifth season for the Golden Hurricane as members of the American Athletic Conference. The Golden Hurricane, led by eighth year head coach Matilda Mossman, plays their home games at the Reynolds Center. They finished the season 13–18, 6–10 in AAC play to finish in a tie for seventh place. They defeated Wichita State in the first round before losing to UCF in the quarterfinals of the American Athletic women's tournament.

Media
All Golden Hurricane games will be broadcast on KTGX CHROME 95.3 FM and KWTU 88.7 FM HD3. The audio broadcast can also be heard on Hurricane Vision. A video stream for all home games will be on Hurricane Vision, ESPN3, or AAC Digital. Road games will typically be streamed on the opponents website, though conference road games could also appear on ESPN3 or AAC Digital.

Roster

Schedule and results

|-
!colspan=12 style=| Exhibition

|-
!colspan=12 style=| Non-conference regular season

|-
!colspan=12 style=| AAC regular season

|-
!colspan=12 style=| AAC Women's Tournament

See also
 2018–19 Tulsa Golden Hurricane men's basketball team

References

Tulsa
Tulsa Golden Hurricane women's basketball seasons